Bolax gummifera is a species of flowering plant in the genus Bolax, found in the Patagonian Andes and the  Falkland Islands.

References

Plants described in 1818
Azorelloideae
Flora of southern Chile